Sung Wei Yi (宋唯一) was born in Liaoning Province in 1855. He was the Grandmaster of the Wudang Sword.

He introduced the sword to both Chen-style t'ai chi ch'uan and Yang-style t'ai chi ch'uan; he taught the Wudang Sword to Guo Qi Feng 郭岐鳳, General Li Jing Lin 李景林, and Fu Chen Sung 傅振嵩.

References

1855 births
Swordfighters
Chinese swordsmanship
Year of death missing
Tai chi practitioners from Liaoning